Czarna Woda  is a village in the administrative district of Gmina Murów, within Opole County, Opole Voivodeship, in south-western Poland.

The village has a population of 32.

References

Czarna Woda